The Hispaniolan dry forests are a tropical dry broadleaf forest ecoregion on the island of Hispaniola (split between the Dominican Republic and Haiti). They cover , around 20% of the island's area.

Geography
The dry forests are found mostly on the southern and western portions of the island of Hispaniola, covering portions of both the Dominican Republic and Haiti. The ecoregion covers the southern and western coastal lowlands, the Cul-de-Sac–Enriquillo lowland, and the Cibao Valley in the north-central portion of the island.

Flora
Plant communities include high dry forest and cactus scrub dominated by species of Prosopis, Pilosocereus, Hippomane, Cylindropuntia, Agave, and Bursera, as well as Melocactus lemairei.

Fauna
Given the climate, reptiles are numerous in this region. Species found include Ricord's iguanas (Cyclura ricordii), rhinoceros iguanas (C. cornuta), Hispaniola racers (Haitiophis anomalus), and Barreras fanged snakes (Ialtris agyrtes). A 2017 study found that extinct giant tortoises (Chelonoidis marcanoi) found on Hispaniola were specialists adapted to dry, open habitats and had a major role in shaping this ecoregion; following a decrease in the extent of these ecosystems after the end of the Pleistocene, these tortoises were restricted to refugia habitats up until their extinction.

Protected areas
2,859 km, or 19%, of the ecoregion is in protected areas. Protected areas include Anacaona National Park, Canapé-Vert National Park, Francisco Alberto Caamaño Deñó National Park, Grand Bois National Park, Jaragua National Park (1535.5 km), La Gran Sabana National Park, Lagon des Huîtres National Park, Les Matheux National Park, Máximo Gómez National Park, Picky Lora National Park, Sierra de Bahoruco National Park (1091.8 km), Sierra Martín García National Park, Three Bays National Park, Arroyo Cano Forest Reserve (23.9 km), Barrero Forest Reserve (192.2 km), Cabeza de Toro Forest Reserve (5.9 km), Cerro de Bocanigua Forest Reserve (29.2 km), Carretera Cabral - Polo panoramic road (12 km), and Carretera Santiago - La Cumbre - Puerto Plata panoramic road (21 km).

References

External links
 
 Hispaniolan dry forests (DOPA)
 Hispaniolan dry forests (Encyclopedia of Earth)

Neotropical dry broadleaf forests
Ecoregions of the Caribbean
Ecoregions of the Dominican Republic
Ecoregions of Haiti
Geography of Hispaniola